F.O.A.D. (an initialism for "Fuck Off and Die") is the 12th studio album by the Norwegian band Darkthrone. It was released 25 September 2007 by Peaceville Records. Special editions of the album contained a postcard, poster and T-shirt.

Track listing

Credits
Nocturno Culto – electric guitar, bass guitar, vocals
Fenriz – drums, vocals on "Canadian Metal", "Fuck Off and Die", "Raised on Rock", and "Pervertor of the 7 Gates"
Czral – guitar solo on "Church of Real Metal", backing vocals on "Wisdom of the Dead"

References

2007 albums
Darkthrone albums
Peaceville Records albums